Berlin Independent Film Festival (BIFF) is a film festival with a special emphasis on independent films, which annually takes place in Berlin, Germany. It screens German and international films and awards them in various categories. It screens at the historic Kino Babylon, and offers jury awards in many categories as well as two audience awards.

The festival is independent of, but runs concurrently with, the Berlin International Film Festival (Berlinale) in the city, along with the European Film Market.

Description
The festival was founded in 2009 and takes place at the same time as Berlin International Film Festival (Berlinale), but is a separate event, independent from the Berlinale. The European Film Market takes place at the same time, providing an opportunity to market films. The festival takes place at the historic Kino Babylon cinema in Berlin Mitte.

Besides short and feature films of any genre, the festival also exhibits music videos and documentary films. After many screenings, the festival organises question-and-answer panels with the filmmakers. One special emphasis of the festival are features that are the director's first or second film, but it also showcases other independent features. All films are screened with English subtitles, as the audience is international.

Awards
 BIFF offers jury awards in the following categories for films:

 Best Feature (over £100k)
 Best Micro-budget Feature (under £100k)
 Best No-Budget Feature (under £10k)
 Best UK Feature
 Best Documentary
 Best Sci-Fi / Horror Feature
 Best Female Director Feature
 Best LGBT film
 Best Short Film
 Best UK Short
 Best Short Documentary
 Best Animated Short
 Best Experimental Short
 Best Short Short
 Best Horror / Sci-Fi Short
 Best Music Video

There are also four awards for screenplay:
 Best Feature Screenplay
 Best Sci-Fi / Horror Screenplay
 Best EU Screenplay
 Best Comedy Screenplay

Audiences get to vote for Best Feature and Best Short.

Notable films (selection) 
Among many others, the festival has screened the following notable films:
2009: Samson and Delilah, by Australian filmmaker Warwick Thornton
2011: Armless, an American feature film that premiered at Sundance Film Festival the year before
2012: You Missed Sonja, the first German film based on a work by Stephen King
2013: The Taiwan Oyster, an American film that premiered at South by Southwest Film Festival the year before
2013: Jail Caesar (shown under its alternative title StringCaesar), a British production filmed in several working prisons in the UK and South Africa that was produced over the period of several years
2013: Menschenliebe, a German No-Budget-Film winning numerous international awards
2013: Death by Chocolate, the first interactive Swiss music video
2014: Newlyweeds, an American film that premiered at Sundance Film Festival the year before
2016: In Search of a Lost Paradise was screened at two sold-out screenings. It was followed by a question-and-answer panel with Lyudmila Ulitskaya and Alexander Smoljanski. Shortly after winning the award for the best documentary feature at Berlin Independent Film Festival, the film also received a Nika Award.

References

External links

 Berlin Independent Film Festival in IMDb

Film festivals in Berlin
Annual events in Berlin

2009 establishments in Germany
Recurring events established in 2010